Marco Kofler (born 8 May 1989) is a retired footballer from Austria. He has mainly played on the defence front in the matches.

References

External links

1989 births
Living people
Association football defenders
Austrian footballers
FC Wacker Innsbruck (2002) players
FC Hansa Rostock players
SV Elversberg players
SV Wörgl players
Austrian Football Bundesliga players
2. Liga (Austria) players
Austrian Regionalliga players
Regionalliga players
3. Liga players
Austrian expatriate footballers
Expatriate footballers in Germany
Austrian expatriate sportspeople in Germany
Sportspeople from Innsbruck
Footballers from Tyrol (state)